Mark LaMarr Thompson (born December 1, 1955) is an American radio personality (disc jockey) and occasional actor, best known for the nationally syndicated Mark & Brian morning show.

Early life
After attending the University of North Alabama, Thompson worked as a disc jockey at several stations in the southern United States (including WHHY AM 1440 in Montgomery, Alabama) before meeting his partner Brian Phelps in Birmingham, Alabama in 1986. The next year the duo moved their show to KLOS-FM in Los Angeles, where they remained until the show's end in 2012. Thompson's wife, Lynda, their three children (Matthew, Amy and Katie), his nephew David, and his niece Nina are well-known among regular listeners of the program. Thompson plays drums and is a huge Elvis Presley fan. He and Brian both garnered a 1991 National Association of Broadcasters Marconi Award as "Air Personalities of the Year."

Career
The popularity of The Mark & Brian Show gave Thompson several opportunities to branch out into other entertainment media. In 1991-92, he and Phelps hosted a short-lived NBC TV series, The Adventures of Mark & Brian, based on their radio show. Thompson has also appeared in several motion pictures, notably Jason Goes to Hell: The Final Friday (the 1993 ninth installment in the Friday the 13th series) and The Princess Diaries (2001). He also wrote & starred in the 2002 independent film, Mother Ghost, and briefly appeared as a love interest (coincidentally named Brian) of Reba McEntire's character on three episodes in the 2002-2003 season of the Reba television show.

On June 13, 2012, Thompson announced that he would be retiring from radio after 25 years and would move to Charlotte, North Carolina with his wife, mentioning that his new home would be equipped with a studio that would allow him to do occasional media work. His last day at KLOS was August 17, 2012. Thompson and his wife now host The Mark & Lynda Podcast, which focuses primarily on relationship issues. In addition, Thompson co-hosted the Pro Football Slam podcast with Los Angeles Times journalist Sam Farmer during the 2013-2014 football season. That podcast did not return for the 2014-2015 season. He also began hosting the Cool Stories in Music podcast in December 2013. According to Thompson, the podcast is inspired by the biographies, stories, and chart trivia segments of the Kasem-era American Top 40 radio program.

On December 8, 2014, Thompson announced on his podcast he would be returning to morning radio in Los Angeles and that he would be doing morning drive from his home studio in North Carolina. The Mark and Lynda podcast will continue, but will be shifted later in the day and will be shorter. He also announced that Cool Stories in Music will be syndicated on Sunday on the same radio station.

Thompson began hosting a radio show, "Mark in the Morning" which started on February 2, 2015 on rival classic rock station 100.3 KSWD The Sound in Los Angeles. His on-air talent includes Andy Chanley, Gina Grad, and his daughter, Katie Thompson, as "Chick on the Street". Daniel Mizrahi is the only staff member he brought over from his time at KLOS. Mark was eventually let go from his position due to low ratings, and exited KSWD on August 3, 2016, and plans to launch a syndicated radio program, "Cool Stories in Music."

On August 17, 2020 The Radio Hall of Fame has announced its list of inductees for its 2020 class. Longtime 95.5 KLOS Los Angeles morning hosts Mark Thompson and Brian Phelps (Longstanding Local/Regional). https://www.radiohalloffame.com/2020-inductees

In September 2022, Thompson released his memoir, 'Don't Bump the Record, Kid: My Adventures With Mark and Brian' and appeared at various events on his book tour.

References

External links
http://www.mandlstudios.com/

American radio DJs
1955 births
Living people
University of North Alabama alumni
People from Florence, Alabama